Edvinas Šeškus (born 10 March 1995) is a Lithuanian basketball player for CBet Jonava of the Lithuanian Basketball League. He mainly plays the shooting guard position.  
He is 196 cm (6' 5") tall and weighs 100 kg (220 lbs).

Career
A 13-year-old Šeškus started his career with BC Rūdupis of the NKL in 2008, scoring four points and grabbing a rebound against BC Alytus. The next season, he became the youngest player ever to debut in the strongest Lithuanian basketball league, the LKL. He recorded 2 turnovers against BC Perlas. In 2010, he played for BC Perlas-MRU and then transferred to Šarūnas Marčiulionis Basketball Academy, both times struggling to establish himself as the leader in the NKL, but dominating in the MKL league, averaging about 23 points in 30 minutes of playing time while representing the Academy in his age group. He played for Vilnius Sakalai during the 2012-2013 season. Šeškus played for one-and-half seasons for Lietuvos Rytas Vilnius before returning to BC Perlas on a loan in January 2015.

In the 2014-15 season, Šeškus's averages in EuroCup and LKL totaled about 3 points per game.

Personal life
Edvinas is the son of Virginijus Šeškus, a longtime BC Prienai coach. His older brother Domantas also plays basketball professionally.

Šeškus is a husband of Dalia Belickaitė.

References

1995 births
Living people
BC Prienai players
Iraklis Thessaloniki B.C. players
KK Pärnu players
Lithuanian expatriate basketball people in Estonia
Lithuanian men's basketball players
Shooting guards
Small forwards
Expatriate basketball people in Taiwan
Taiwan Beer basketball players
Pauian Archiland basketball players
Super Basketball League imports